The Circassian Revolution refers to a series of revolts by Circassian farmers which resulted in the most developed regions of Circassia abandoning social classes and switching to democracy.

History 
In 1770, the free farmers of Abzakh Circassians revolted against the aristocratic class. Captured princes were killed. Those who escaped took refuge in other Circassian tribes. All privileges held by the princes, who were aristocratic and noble class, were abolished by free farmers. While many contemporary French nobles took refuge in Russia during the similar revolution in France, some of the Circassian nobles took the same path and refuge in Russia.

In July 14, 1791 the Natukhaj commoners peacefully took power from the aristocrats, declaring a republic. A similar attempt among the Shapsugs led to a civil war which the commons won in 1803. Famous Circassian writer and historian Amjad Jaimoukha says that from 1770 to 1790 there was a class war among the Abadzeks that resulted in the extermination of the princes and the banishment of most of the nobility. The three west-central "democratic" tribes, Natukhaj, Shapsugs and Abedzeks, who formed the majority of the Circassians, managed their affairs through assemblies with only informal powers. Sefer Bey Zanuqo, the three Naibs of Shamil and the British adventurers all tried to organize the Circassians – with limited success. 

The Bzhedug tribe helped the exiled princes which further escalated conflicts. The newly established revolutionary states of Abdzakh and Shapsug attacked the Bzhedug in order to kill their former nobility.

Notes

References 

Revolutions